Dark Was the Night is a 2018 American drama film written and directed by Joshua Leonard and starring Marisa Tomei, Charlie Plummer and Timothy Olyphant.

The film premiered at the 2018 Galway Film Fleadh under its original title Behold My Heart.

Plot
After the unexpected death of Steven Lang (Olyphant), his widow, Margaret (Tomei) and son, Marcus (Plummer), struggle to cope with their grief.

Cast
 Marisa Tomei as Margaret Lang
 Charlie Plummer as Marcus Lang
 Timothy Olyphant as Steven Lang
 Mireille Enos as Nancy
 Emily Robinson as Tracy
 Nik Dodani as Seamus
 Sakina Jaffrey as Jane
 David Call as Jake
 Saidah Arrika Ekulona as Betsy
 Blesst Bowden as Beth
 Dakota Peterson as Tony
 Paris Peterson as Paul
 Savanna Reggio as Heather
 Veronica Diaz-Carranza as Victoria
 Karrie Cox as Christine Smith

Release
The film premiered on July 12, 2018 at the Galway Film Fleadh in Ireland.

References

External links

2018 films
2018 drama films
American drama films
Films about alcoholism
Films about grieving
Films about families
Films directed by Joshua Leonard
2010s English-language films
2010s American films